The October 2014 Nicaragua earthquake occurred at  with a moment magnitude of 7.3 off the coast of Nicaragua, Honduras and El Salvador. The shock resulted in four deaths and several injuries.

Impact
A homeless man sleeping on a sidewalk died when a power line fell on him. Two others also died from heart-attacks in San Miguel and Santiago de María respectively. In San Miguel, around 31 buildings, including five schools collapsed or were damaged, five of which were in San Salvador. One of the city's hospitals was also damaged. There was also major damage to buildings in the Department of Usulután, particularly the municipalities of Berlín and Alegría, where several buildings partially collapsed. The roads to the regional capital were partially blocked by landslides. Some damage was also reported in Leon, Nicaragua, where a church and over 2,000 homes were damaged in Quezalguaque, and 37 buildings collapsed. Some hospitals there had to be evacuated. Power outages and several injuries were also reported in Honduras, where one person died of a heart-attack in Choluteca. Among the injured was a child who was hit by a falling wall. Several people have been taken to hospitals with nervous breakdowns.

See also
 List of earthquakes in 2014
 List of earthquakes in Nicaragua

References

Earthquakes in Nicaragua
Earthquakes in El Salvador
Earthquakes in Honduras
2014 earthquakes
2014 in Nicaragua
2014 in Honduras
2014 in El Salvador
October 2014 events in North America